Wirth Research is a group of engineering companies, founded by Nicholas Wirth in 2003, specialising in research, development, design and manufacture for the motor racing industry and other high technology sectors.

The companies use virtual engineering technologies to enable a completely simulated vehicle design, development and testing process. The group is known for deviating from traditional physical development models; most notably neglecting to use a wind tunnel and instead relying solely upon computational fluid dynamics to design the 2010 Virgin Racing VR-01 Formula 1 car.

The Wirth Research group have a long-standing partnership with Honda Performance Development Inc (HPD) which is responsible for the design, development and manufacture of the ARX sports cars. Wirth Research also provides client IndyCar teams with full technical support.

Design
Wirth Research encompasses design disciplines that include:

 Composite structures
 Suspension
 Transmission
 Electronics and Control
 Hydraulics
 Cooling, lubrication and engine ancillaries
 R&D, component systems and whole-vehicle testing

Wirth Research uses tools provided by Siemens UGS PLM for many of its design activities.

Computational Fluid Dynamics

The company uses ANSYS Fluent solvers for its analysis.

Aerodynamic design

The largest department at Wirth Research, whose Computational Fluid Dynamics contents are typically evaluated by WR Digital.

Whilst the company is not known for using physical models in the development process, it does use real-world wind-tunnel testing to verify its CFD results.

Vehicle simulation

Two identical simulators are split between HPD's headquarters in Indianapolis and the company's base in Bicester. They are built in partnership with Cruden on a modified 6 degree of freedom motion platform constructed of carbon fibre and presently housing a DW12 Monocoque. The display mode consists of numerous projectors providing a passive stereoscopic 3D 170 degree display of a modified version of the Racer simulation engine.

Virtual reality

Virtual reality and augmented reality applications such as Emersio are developed and used by Wirth Research for assessing ergonomic issues and presenting new ideas in 1:1 scale.

References

Racing simulators
Motor vehicle manufacturers of England
Motor vehicle assembly plants in the United Kingdom
Motorsport in England
Automotive companies of England
Engineering companies of England
Sports car manufacturers
Sports car racing
Computational fluid dynamics
Computer-aided engineering
Companies based in Oxfordshire